McLeod Ganj, also spelt McLeodganj, (pronounced Mc-loud-gunj) is a suburb of Dharamshala in the Kangra district of Himachal Pradesh, India. It is known as "Little Lhasa" or "Dhasa" (a short form of Dharamshala used mainly by Tibetans) because of its large population of Tibetans. The Tibetan government-in-exile is headquartered in McLeod Ganj which treats the suburb as its Capital-in-exile.

Etymology
McLeod Ganj was named after Sir Donald Friell McLeod, a Lieutenant Governor of Punjab; the suffix ganj is a common Persian word used for "neighbourhood".

History
In March 1850, the area was annexed by the British after the Second Anglo-Sikh War, and soon a subsidiary cantonment for the troops stationed at Kangra was established on the slopes of Dhauladhar, on empty land, with a Hindu resthouse or dharamshala; hence the name for the new cantonment, Dharamshala. During the British rule in India, the town was a hill station where the British spent hot summers, and around the late 1840s, when the district headquarters in Kangra became overcrowded, the British moved two regiments to Dharamshala. A cantonment was established in 1849, and in 1852 Dharamshala became the administrative capital of Kangra district. By 1855, it had two important places of civilian settlement, McLeod Ganj and Forsyth Ganj, named after a Divisional Commissioner. In 1860, the 66th Gurkha Light Infantry, later renamed the historic 1st Gurkha Rifles, was moved to Dharamshala. Soon, 14 Gurkha paltan villages were established nearby and the Gurkhas patronised the ancient Shiva temple of Bhagsunath.

Lord Elgin, the British Viceroy of India (1862–63), liked the area so much that at one point he suggested it be made the summer capital of India. He died at Dharamshala while on a tour there, on 20 November 1863, and lies buried at the St. John in the Wilderness church at Forsyth Ganj, just below McLeod Ganj. His summer residence, Mortimer House, became part of the private estate of Lala Basheshar Nath of Lahore and was acquired by the Government of India to house the official residence of the Dalai Lama.

The twin towns of Forsyth Ganj and McLeod Ganj continued to grow steadily in the coming years, and by 1904 had become important centres of trade, commerce and official work of Kangra District. Much of the town was destroyed by the devastating 7.8 magnitude 1905 Kangra earthquake at 6:19 am 4 April 1905; close to 19,800 people were killed and thousands were injured in the Kangra area. The earthquake destroyed most buildings in Kangra, Dharamshala, and McLeod Ganj, including the Bhagsunath Temple. Thereafter, district headquarters were shifted to a lower spot, and the town waited another half century before anything significant transpired in its history.

In March 1959, Tenzin Gyatso, the 14th Dalai Lama, fled to India after the failed uprising in 1959 in Tibet against the Chinese Communist Party. The Indian Government offered him refuge in Dharamshala, where he set up the Government of Tibet in exile in 1960, while McLeod Ganj became his official residence and also home to several Buddhist monasteries and thousands of Tibetan refugees. Over the years, McLeod Ganj evolved into an important tourist and pilgrimage destination, and has since grown substantially in population.

Geography
McLeod Ganj has an average elevation of 2,082 metres (6,831 feet). It is situated on the Dhauladhar Range.

The major towns near McLeod Ganj include Dharamshala, Palampur, Kangra, Sidhbari, Tatwani, and Machhrial. Other nearby spiritual attractions include Chinmaya Tapovan (a Hindu retreat centre), Osho Nisarga (an Osho retreat centre) and Chamunda (a pilgrimage place for Hindus). The trekking route to Triund starts from McLeod Ganj.

Transport
The nearest airport is Kangra Airport, 15 km from Dharamshala.

The nearest railway stations on the narrow-gauge Kangra Valley Railway line are at Kangra and Nagrota (about 20 km south of Dharamshala). The nearest railhead (broad gauge) is at Pathankot (85 km).

Travel by bus is the most common medium of transport used by the people. Mcleod Ganj is about 9 km from Dharamshala and around 485 km from Delhi. It takes about 10–11 hours of journey to reach Mcleod Ganj from Delhi via a bus, and there is regular service available with more than 4-5 buses plying everyday on the route.

Economy

Tourism is an important industry in McLeod Ganj. Many people come to study Tibetan Buddhism, culture, crafts, etc. The town is also known for Tibetan handicrafts, thangkas, Tibetan carpets, garments, and other souvenirs.

Landmarks

The most important Buddhist site in the town is Tsuglagkhang or Tsuglag Khang, the Dalai Lama's temple. It has statues of Shakyamuni, Avalokiteśvara, and a statue of Padmasambhava (Guru Rinpoche).

Other Buddhist and Tibetan sites in McLeod Ganj include the Namgyal Monastery, Gompa Dip Tse-Chok Ling (a small monastery), the Library of Tibetan Works and Archives, Gangchen Kyishong (called Gangkyi for short by Tibetans and the premises of the Tibetan government-in-exile), Mani Lakhang Stupa, Nechung Monastery, and Norbulingka Institute, which is 8 kilometres away. The 17th Karmapa, Ogyen Trinley Dorje, lives near Dharamshala, in Gyuto monastery in Sidhbari.

St. John in the Wilderness
An Anglican church located in the forest near Forsyth Ganj. The neo-Gothic stone building was constructed in 1852. The site also has an old graveyard and a memorial to the British Viceroy Lord Elgin. The church is also noted for its Belgian stained-glass windows, donated by Lady Elgin.

Dal Lake
A small lake about 3 km from McLeod Ganj, next to one of the Tibetan Children's Villages schools. An annual fair is held there in August or September, attended mainly by the Gaddi Community. There is a small spring and an old temple near the lake. Above Dal lake is Naddi Village.

Bhagsu Nath
 An area 10 minutes' rickshaw ride from McLeod Ganj, the area has roughly 1,200 local Indians.

Bhagsu Falls
 Bhagsu Falls, a waterfall about 20 meters tall, is about two kilometers from McLeod Ganj. There is a cafeteria next to the falls and the area serves as a picnic spot for tourists. Nearby is Bhagsunath Temple, dedicated to Lord Shiva, also an attraction for tourists and Hindu pilgrims. The Shiva Cafe can be reached by crossing these falls and climbing further.
Jama Masjid Dharamshala Main Market In Kotwali Bazar, Near Old Bus Stand Dharamshala,

Culture

The Tibet Museum, established in 1998 and inaugurated by the 14th Dalai Lama on 20 April 2000, has a collection of Tibetan artifacts and photographs showing Tibetans' struggle to preserve their way of life against oppressive forces. The museum is adjacent to the Dalai Lama temple (Tsuglag Khang). It is the official museum of the Central Tibetan Administration Department of Information and International Relations. The museum aims to spread awareness about the history of the occupation of Tibet and the exodus that Tibetan resistance against Chinese oppression ultimately led to. 
Currently the 14th Dalai Lama lives here

The museum displays over 30,000 photographs. Visitors are also encouraged to watch a documentary showing the journey of Tibetan refugees into exile across the Himalayas. It is screened every day at 3 p.m. and the entry fee is INR 10. In addition, a host of activities and events, such as talk sessions, workshops, documentary screenings are organised at the museum complex throughout the year.

The Dharamshala International Film Festival (DIFF) is held annually.

Notes and references

External links

A Guide to Little Lhasa in India Government of Tibet in Exile website.

Cities and towns in Kangra district
Dharamshala
Hill stations in Himachal Pradesh
Tibetan Buddhist places
Tibetan diaspora in India
Tourism in Himachal Pradesh